August 14 is a 2020 Bangladeshi crime thriller streaming television series written & directed by Shihab Shaheen for the online video on demand platform Binge. It features Tasnuva Tisha, Shatabdi Wadud, Shahiduzzaman Selim in lead roles. The series is inspired from a true incident of 2013, when a police officer Mahfuzur Rahman & his wife Swapna Rahman were murdered by their own drug addicted daughter Oishee Rahman at their Chamelibagh resident in Dhaka. It is the first ever real-life crime television series of Bangladesh.

Cast
 Tasnuva Tisha as Tushi Islam:
 Drug addicted daughter of police officer Rafiqul Islam and Shanta Islam.
 Shahiduzzaman Selim as Rafiqul Islam:
 Police officer.
 Monira Mithu as Shanta Islam:
 Wife of police officer Rafiqul Islam.
 Shatabdi Wadud as Khaled:
 Investigating Officer (IO) of Rafiqul Islam & Shanta Islam murder case.
 Farhana Endra as Khaled's Wife
 Sayed Zaman Shawon as Jimmy
 Abu Hurayra Tanvir as Rumi
 Uzzal Mahamud as Sattar
 Fakhrul Bashar Masum as SP
 Nur E Alam Nayan as Jashim
 Mashhur Goni Golpo
 Zannat
 Sijat Shimul
 Hindol Roy
 Sazu
 Onuvob

Episodes

See also
 Mohanagar
 Taqdeer
 Ladies & Gentleman
 Unoloukik

References

External links
 

Bangladeshi web series
Crime television series
Murder in television
2020 in Bangladeshi television
2020 web series debuts
Bangladeshi crime drama television series
Streaming television in Bangladesh